Savinsky is a rural locality (a khutor) in Dobrinskoye Rural Settlement, Surovikinsky District, Volgograd Oblast, Russia. The population was 219 as of 2010. There are 2 streets.

Geography 
Savinsky is located on the Levaya Dobraya River, 46 km northeast of Surovikino (the district's administrative centre) by road. Dobrinka is the nearest rural locality.

References 

Rural localities in Surovikinsky District